The National German Sustainability Award was established in 2008 to encourage the acceptance of social and ecological responsibility and to identify role models in the area of sustainability. The award is endorsed by the German Federal Government, local and business associations as well as numerous NGOs, among them UNESCO and UNICEF. The awards are presented to cities, companies and individuals promoting the idea of a sustainable society by Federal Chancellor Angela Merkel or other members of her cabinet. Responsible for the award is the foundation Deutscher Nachhaltigkeitspreis e.V.

Awards
The German Sustainability Award includes the categories companies, products, municipalities (since 2012), research (since 2012), building (since 2013) and next economy (since 2016). Each category includes more than one award, for example includes die categories companies award for SMEs, medium-big and big companies.

See also

 List of environmental awards

References

External links
The National German Sustainability Award site (English summary).
The National German Sustainability Award site (German).

Environmental awards
Awards established in 2008
Energy and the environment